Neethaane En Ponvasantham is a 2012 Indian Tamil-language romantic drama film co written, co produced and directed by Gautham Vasudev Menon, starring Jiiva and Samantha. This film is shot simultaneously in Telugu, Yeto Vellipoyindhi Manasu, with Nani replacing Jiiva, while the team also briefly filmed an incomplete Hindi version (Assi Nabbe Poorey Sau) with Aditya Roy Kapoor, with Samantha playing the leading female role in all three versions. The film is based on a story written by Reshma Ghatala, who produced the film alongside Elred Kumar, Venkat Somasundaram and Menon. The cinematography was handled by M. S. Prabhu and Om Prakash. The film's background score and soundtrack were composed by Ilaiyaraaja which went on to become a chartbuster, and the soundtrack album sold a record 8.5 million units through various platforms on its release.

Neethaane En Ponvasantham tells the love story of Varun (Jiiva) and Nithya (Samantha) through three stages of their life; their school days, college life and then in their late twenties. The film was released on 14 December 2012, receiving positive to mixed reviews from critics, before enduring a good run at the box office.

The film was praised for its ravishing music and the chemistry between the lead actors; Jiiva and Samantha were appreciated for their performances, although the film's screenplay was criticised. At the end of its theatrical run Neethane En Ponvasantham received a number of awards, including the Filmfare Award for Best Tamil Actress for Samantha.

Story

Varun and Nithya were childhood friends who were misunderstood by each other. Later they unite each other during school after having a good conversation. And varun joins nithya's school to be with her. But this was not the result. Nithya was close to Deepak, a classmate, which made Varun angry about that and they fought again. Finally, they became enemies. During a college festival, Varun again falls in love with Nithya by admiring her performances and beauty in the culturals. Nithya and Varun talk again and both fall in love. One day, when the two are sitting in a car on a rainy day, Nithya proposes to Varun. The love between them strengthens until when Varun's father tells him to finish the CAT exams for a better future. Varun doesn't talk as much as he used to with Nithya, due to the amount of revision he does for the CAT. Varun gets a seat in college at Kerala. Nithya asks Varun whether she can also come with him. But Varun does not encourage this, as he thought she must not be jobless by coming with him for no reason, which causes another fight between the pair.

Years later, Varun searches for Nithya, with the assistance of his friends. He finds Nithya is at Manapad, a village in Tamil Nadu and goes there. He professes his love to Nithya, but she rejects and scolds him. They break up again after the row. Varun has a marriage fixed for him and Nithya is sad as she scolded Varun in anger. The day before Varun's marriage, Nithya and Varun share their thoughts. After that, Varun's dad talks to him about Nithya, noting his infatuation with her and urging him to make the right decision. The next morning, Varun stops his marriage and tells Nithya's father about their romance. The film ends, showing Varun and Nithya had fought and united and lived happily as a family.

Cast

 Jiiva as Varun Krishnan
Manav as Young Varun
 Samantha Ruth Prabhu as Nithya Vasudevan
Khushi Jain as Young Nithya
 Ravi Prakash as Harish
Saran Shakthi as Young Harish
 Santhanam as Prakash
 Vidyullekha Raman as Jenny
 Ravi Raghavendra as Krishnan
 Sriranjani as Nithya's mother
 Anupama Kumar as Varun's mother
 Christine Thambuswamy as Vidya Vasudevan
 Abhilash Babu as Deepak
 Abhishek Jain
 Arjun Rajkumar
 Rajkumar Pichumani as Varun's friend 
 Ashwathy Ravikumar as Radhika
 Dhanya Balakrishna as Nithya's friend
 Kavita Srinivasan
 Kota Prasanth
 Preethi Rajendran
 Rajesh Trakkia
 Sahithya Jagannathan as Nithya's friend
 Shriya Sharma as Kavya Vasudevan
 Swetha Shekhar
 Vaidyanathan
 Vetri
 Vivek Pathak
 Nani as a train passenger (special appearance in "Kaatrai Konjam")
 VTV Ganesh as Ganesh (special appearance)
 Sathish Krishnan as a dancer at Vidya's wedding (special appearance)

Production

Development
After agreeing terms with RS Infotainment to direct their next venture, Gautham Menon co-wrote a screenplay based on a story by Reshma Ghatala. The director then met Jiiva to discuss a potential collaboration in May 2011 for his next venture, which would begin following the completion of his current project Ekk Deewana Tha. Menon then cast Jiiva in the Tamil version of a bilingual film that he had originally planned to make featuring Ram and Samantha. Film editor Anthony, cinematographer Manoj Paramahamsa and composer A. R. Rahman were all touted to be a part of the film; however M. S. Prabhu replaced Paramahamsa and in December 2011 sources indicated that Rahman too would probably not work for this film, owing to his other commitments. Reports subsequently suggested that Harris Jayaraj may work with Menon again, but the composer dismissed those few days later. Menon clarified that he never announced any music director for the film and that he wanted to keep it as a surprise. In late January 2012, Ilaiyaraaja confirmed that he would be working with Gautham Menon.

A Telugu and a Hindi version, titled Yeto Vellipoyindhi Manasu and Assi Nabbe Poorey Sau, were also being simultaneously made, with Nani in the former and Aditya Roy Kapoor playing the lead role in the latter, while Samantha played the female lead in all versions. Initial suggestions indicated that the film was also set to be titled Nithya, after Samantha's character in the film, but this turned out to be untrue. The title was revealed through the first publicity posters to be Neethaane En Ponvasantham, inspired by a song from the 1982 film Ninaivellam Nithya. An official announcement was made by the producers of the film, RS Infotainment, that a photo shoot was planned in August and the film would also shoot portions across the United Kingdom. To prepare for his role, Jiiva had to lose weight for the film and had to undertake diet regimens and work out sessions to get in shape for the character. Furthermore, it was revealed that he would sport three different looks in the film as the film encompasses 15 years. Ravi Raghavendra and Anupama Kumar were added to the cast to play Jiiva's parents, while Santhanam was also chosen to play a college student in the film. Film historian Mohan Raman's daughter Vidyullekha Raman, a theatre artist, made her acting debut in this film as the female lead's friend.

Filming
The film had been set to begin the first schedule on 15 August 2011 but delays led to it only starting fortnight later. It eventually commenced the initial shoot from 29 August 2011 with a photo shoot held and publicity posters were released the following week. The team shot across Chennai in the first week of the first schedule, with scenes filmed at the cinema multiplex Mayajaal and at a coffee shop, Cafe Coffee Day, on the East Coast Road. Many scenes were shot in SSN College of Engineering near Kelambakkam, a college in Chennai, where Jiiva's character was shown to be studying. The film was shot alongside the two other versions, with the film shooting the same scene thrice with the various casts. In late August 2012, important scenes were canned in Kalpakkam.

The Hindi remake of the film was temporarily stalled, following the box office failure of Ekk Deewana Tha and Menon noted he planned to observe the reception of the Tamil and Telugu versions and then probably go ahead with its remake in Hindi after completing pending projects. However, Gautham Menon insisted that only Aditya's dates had been a problem and that instead the team would go ahead with the Tamil and Telugu release while postponing the Hindi version. Although statements were released by Photon Kathaas suggesting the venture was set to resume, it has been indefinitely shelved.

Music

Menon approached Ilaiyaraaja to compose music for the film. The soundtrack album consists of eight tracks, with lyrics penned by Na. Muthukumar, replacing Gautham Menon's usual associate lyricist Thamarai for the first time. 7 singers have lent their voices for the songs, including composer Ilaiyaraaja, Karthik, Raaja's son Yuvan Shankar Raja, N. S. Krishnan's grand daughter Ramya NSK, Suraj Jagan, Sunidhi Chauhan and Bela Shende. Over one lakh audio CDs were booked in advance, prior to the audio launch. Neethaane En Ponvasantham'''s soundtrack was released on 1 September 2012 at the Jawaharlal Nehru Indoor Stadium, Chennai in a grand event, during which the songs were performed live by the original artists along with the Anglo-Indian Music Productions orchestra and Hungarian session musicians who had also worked on the film's score.

ReleaseNeethaane En Ponvasantham was given a U certificate by the Indian Censor Board, without any cuts. The movie along with its Telugu version saw worldwide release on 14 December 2012, clashing with Prabu Solomon's Kumki, both becoming the most anticipated films of the year, because of the success of the soundtrack. Two days before the release of Neethaane En Ponvasantham along with Kumki, the advanced bookings for the first weekend were sold out.

The film grossed  at the Chennai box office in the 16th weekend. It totally grossed .

Marketing
The first poster of Neethane En Ponvasantham depicting the lead pair was unveiled in early September 2011. On Valentine's Day 2012, a teaser trailer of 50 seconds featuring Samantha and Jiiva with an instrumental version of the song "Neethaane En Ponvasantham" playing in the background was released, claiming the film to be a Summer 2012 release. However, due to the lead actors' other commitments that shifted dates of filming, eventually release was rescheduled to 4th quarter of 2012.  On 1 September 2012, the official theatrical trailer of the film was released. The response to the theatrical trailer was highly positive, that it crossed 1.2 million views in two days of its release, breaking the record of the most ever viewed Tamil film trailer held earlier by Billa 2.

 Reception Neethaane En Ponvasantham received mixed reviews upon release. The Times of India rated it 3.5 out of 5 and called it "an ideal date movie, despite the slow pace and the flaws". Vivek Ramz of in.com rated it 3 out of 5 and wrote, "Neethaane En Ponvasantham is not a bad film at all and has its moments, but one expects more from director of Gautham's calibre. Overall, it's a one-time watch!" OneIndia gave the film 3/5 stars, saying, "Like Vinnaithaandi Varuvaayaa and Vaaranam Aayiram, the film runs in a slow pace and at parts it is boring." However, Pavithra Srinivasan of Rediff'' gave the movie 2.5/5 stars, calling the movie "disappointing... The second half of the story is full of tears, recriminations and quarrels that make little sense. The arguments and debates...fall flat, and you get tired of the back-and-forth." IBN Live said the movie "sadly...fails to engage the audience with its clichéd presentation". Moviecrow.com gave the film 3/5 and stated, "The story drags and the moments are mostly pedestrian... Situations and scenes are sometimes repetitive. It is unclear why the director chose to shoot so many important scenes without any cuts and in wide range".

Accolades

References

External links
 

2012 romantic drama films
Indian romantic drama films
Films directed by Gautham Vasudev Menon
2012 films
2010s Tamil-language films
Indian multilingual films
Films scored by Ilaiyaraaja
2012 multilingual films